In the Darkness of the Night is a 2004 Portuguese drama film directed by João Canijo. It was screened in the Un Certain Regard section at the 2004 Cannes Film Festival.

Cast
Fernando Luís as Nelson Pinto
Rita Blanco as Celeste Pinto
Beatriz Batarda as Carla Pinto
Cleia Almeida as Sónia Pinto
Natalya Simakova as Irka (as Nataliya Zymakova)
José Raposo as Nicolau, Nelson's Associate
Dmitry Bogomolov as Fyodor
João Reis as Sónia's Boyfriend
Anna Belozorovich as Olga
Antonio Ferreira as Pressure Cooker
Ramón Martinez as Sebastião
Ana Luísa Leão as Paloma
Anabela Moreira as Rute
Helena Alves as Iris
Jinie Rainho as Brigina

References

External links

2004 drama films
Films directed by João Canijo
Films produced by Paulo Branco
Golden Globes (Portugal) winners
Portuguese drama films